Patrik Gustavsson (born 19 April 2001) is a professional footballer who plays as a striker for Thai League club BG Pathum United. Born in Sweden, he represents Thailand at youth level.

International career
On 16 March 2022, Patrik was called up to the Thailand U23 national team for the 2022 Dubai Cup U-23. On 26 March 2022, he played first national match against China. He scored his first international goal on 6 May 2022 against Malaysia in 2021 Southeast Asian Games.

Honours

International
Thailand U23
 Southeast Asian Games  Silver Medal: 2021

References

External links

2001 births
Living people
Patrik Gustavsson
Patrik Gustavsson
Patrik Gustavsson
Patrik Gustavsson
Association football forwards
Competitors at the 2021 Southeast Asian Games
Patrik Gustavsson